Niomoune is a village and rural community in Kataba Arrondissement, Bignona Department, Ziguinchor Region, Casamance, Senegal.

In the 2002 census the village had 1,663 inhabitants in 231 households.

References

Populated places in the Bignona Department